The Shoot (German: Der Schut) is a 1964 adventure film directed by Robert Siodmak and starring Lex Barker, Marie Versini and Ralf Wolter. It was made as a co-production between West Germany, France, Italy and Yugoslavia. It is based on the 1892 novel of the same title by Karl May, and was part of a cycle of adaptations of his work started by Rialto Film's series of western films. It was a commercial success, benefiting from the presence of Barker and Versini who were stars of Rialto's series.

It was shot at the Tempelhof and Spandau Studios in Berlin and on location in Kosovo and Montenegro then part of Yugoslavia. The film's sets were designed by the art director Dragoljub Ivkov. It was shot in Eastmancolor.

Synopsis
In the Balkans, then part of the Ottoman Empire, two travellers assist in the battle against a notorious bandit who has kidnapped a French engineer.

Cast

References

Bibliography 
 Bergfelder, Tim. International Adventures: German Popular Cinema and European Co-Productions in the 1960s. Berghahn Books, 2005.
 Goble, Alan. The Complete Index to Literary Sources in Film. Walter de Gruyter, 1999.

External links 
 

1964 films
1960s historical adventure films
German historical adventure films
West German films
1960s German-language films
Films directed by Robert Siodmak
French historical adventure films
Italian historical adventure films
Yugoslav historical adventure films
Gloria Film films
Films shot at Spandau Studios
Films shot at Tempelhof Studios
Films set in the 19th century
Films based on the Orient Cycle
1960s German films
1960s Italian films
1960s French films